Huber's equation, first derived by a Polish engineer Tytus Maksymilian Huber, is a basic formula in elastic material tension calculations, an equivalent of the equation of state, but applying to solids. In most simple expression and commonly in use it looks like this:

Finds application in calculating the span width of the bridges, their beam cross-sections, etc.

See also
 Yield surface
 Stress–energy tensor
 Tensile stress
 von Mises yield criterion

References

Physical quantities
Structural analysis